Dover Priory railway station is the southern terminus of the South Eastern Main Line in England, and is the main station serving the town of Dover, Kent, the other open station being , on the outskirts. It is  down the line from London Victoria. The station and all trains that serve the station are operated by Southeastern. This station is a 25 min walk away from the Ferry Port.

History 
Dover Priory opened on 22 July 1861 as the temporary terminus of the London, Chatham & Dover Railway (LCDR). It became a through station on 1 November 1861, with the completion of a tunnel through the Western Heights to gain access to the Western Docks area, where LCDR created Dover Harbour station The station was known as Dover Town but was renamed in July 1863 (leading to rival SER to adopt the name for one of its Dover stations).

In 1868 stationmaster Edward Walsh(e) was murdered by 18-year-old Thomas Wells, a porter for the LCDR, after having rebuked him for poor work.  Wells was convicted and hanged.

The Southern Railway consolidated passenger services at Priory in 1927 and modernised the station between 1930 and 1932 at a cost of £135,000. The new station re-opened on 8 May 1932.

The Chatham Main Line into Priory was electrified under British Railways in 1959 as part of Stage 1 of Kent Coast Electrification, under the BR 1955 Modernisation Plan. The line up to Ramsgate, via Deal, was subsequently electrified under stage two of Kent Coast electrification in January 1961. The line from Folkestone into Priory was electrified in June 1961.

The high-speed service to London St Pancras started in 2009, after the track in the tunnels to the south was realigned to allow for emergency evacuation from rolling stock without end doors.

Services to and from Folkestone Central were suspended on 24 December 2015 due to major damage to the track and sea wall near Dover harbour caused by strong winds and tidal surges. A replacement bus service was in operation between the two stations, along with a modified timetable whilst repair work was carried out. This was expected to continue throughout 2016, whilst a new £44.5 million viaduct was constructed to replace the present rail embankment and sea wall. The project was scheduled for completion in December 2016, but progressed faster than originally anticipated – the line reopened on 5 September 2016.

Services 

All services at Dover Priory are operated by Southeastern  using  and  EMUs.

The typical off-peak service in trains per hour is:
 1 tph to London Charing Cross via 
 1 tph to  via 
 1 tph to London St Pancras International
 1 tph to 

During the peak hours, there are also direct services to London Cannon Street.

See also 
 List of railway stations in Dover
 Port of Dover
 Port of Calais

References

External links

Railway
Railway
Railway stations in Kent
DfT Category D stations
Former London, Chatham and Dover Railway stations
Railway stations in Great Britain opened in 1861
Railway stations served by Southeastern
Railway stations serving harbours and ports in the United Kingdom
1861 establishments in England